Sir William Douglas of Nithsdale (c. 1370 – 1391) was a Scottish knight and Northern Crusader.

Early life
William Douglas was an illegitimate son of Archibald the Grim, 3rd Earl of Douglas and an unknown mother.

A man of apparently dashing bearing, Douglas was with the Franco-Scots army when it unsuccessfully besieged Carlisle Castle in 1385, the defending Governor being Lord Clifford. He is recorded as performing feats of valour and killing many Englishmen. According to Andrew of Wyntoun:

Marriage
Douglas certainly had gained his spurs by 1387 when he married Egidia (or Gelis) Stewart, princess of Scotland, a daughter of King Robert II. According to the Liber Pluscarden, Egidia Stewart's beauty was well renowned. Charles V of France had "sent a certain most subtle painter to do her portrait and portray her charms, intending to take her to wife." But the King of France and all other of Egidia's admirers had lost out to the chivalric charms of Douglas. Part of her marriage portion were the lands of Nithsdale in south-western Scotland, Herbertshire in the county of Stirling and an annuity of £300.

Ireland
Within his first year of marriage the young Nithsdale led a punitive raid against Irish raiders who had been troubling the tenantry of his father's Fiefdom of Galloway. In early summer 1388, with a party of 500 well prepared veteran men-at-arms he sailed into Carlingford Lough, landed outside the town and summoned their leaders. The chief of the townsfolk offered a sum for a temporary truce, to which Nithsdale agreed. Secretly the townsfolk sent off to Dundalk for reinforcements, with which they were obliged. 800 spearmen from Dundalk surprised the Scots camp by night, and were supported by a sortie from Carlingford town. The Scots, veterans of years of brutal Border warfare, drove the Irishmen off, captured the town and burnt it, seized the Castle and captured 15 ships in the harbour. En route back to Scotland Nithsdale "ravaged" the Isle of Man. Nithsdale's expeditionary force sailed back into Loch Ryan with enough time to participate in the raiding of Northern England that was to culminate in the Battle of Otterburn on 19 August, in which he fought with distinction.

Feuding, Crusading and Death
The year after Otterburn a truce was called between Scotland and England. Nithsdale on a knightly quest for glory decided, about 1389, to join the Teutonic Knights, who were fighting the Lithuanians in Baltic region. Nithsdale had previously quarrelled with Lord Clifford, a former adversary at Carlisle and whose forebear had claimed Douglasdale under Edward I of England's oppression.  While both were abroad, it is alleged that Clifford challenged Nithsdale to single combat, and that Douglas even went to France to obtain special armour for the fight. Clifford, however, died on 18 August 1391, but Nithsdale is said to have kept their 'tryst', and whilst walking upon the bridge leading to the main gate at Danzig was "killed by the English". The burghers of Danzig decided that "upon account of a signal service which the Douglas family did to this city in relieving it in its utmost extremities against the Poles, the Scots were allowed to be free burghers of the town". Subsequently, the stone fascia of the Hohe Thor (High Gate) was adorned with the coat of arms of this nobleman and for centuries it was commonly referred to as the Douglas Port or Douglas Gate, described as such as late as 1734.

Issue 
By Princess Egidia, Nithsdale had two children:
Egidia Douglas, known as the "Fair Maid of Nithsdale" married:
1. Henry Sinclair, 2nd Earl of Orkney (d. 1422)
2. Sir Alasdair Stewart (executed 1425) son of Murdoch Stewart, 2nd Duke of Albany
 Sir William Douglas, Knt., Lord of Nithsdale (d.c.1419), knighted when very young as he is described as chevalier in a safe-conduct dated 30 January 1406, when he could not have been more than nineteen.

References

Notes

Sources 
 Maxwell, Sir Herbert. A History of the House of Douglas, 2 vols, London, 1902.
Fraser, Sir William. The Douglas Book 4 vols, Edinburgh, 1885.
Balfour Paul, Sir James. The Scots Peerage 9 vols, Edinburgh, 1906.

1370 births
1391 deaths
Scottish murder victims
Scottish knights
Scottish soldiers
Teutonic Knights
William Douglas of Nithsdale
14th-century Scottish people
People from the State of the Teutonic Order